The CFU Championship (sometimes referred to as the CFU Nations Cup) was a football tournament for teams in the area of Caribbean between the years 1978–1988. It was the precursor of the Caribbean Cup.

Tournament results

Winners

References 

Recurring sporting events established in 1978
Recurring events disestablished in 1988
Defunct international association football competitions in North America

1978 establishments in North America
1988 disestablishments in North America